William Russell Houck (July 26, 1926 – March 9, 2016) was an American prelate of the Roman Catholic Church who served in the Diocese of Jackson in Mississippi, as an auxiliary bishop and then as bishop from 1979 to 2003.

Biography
William Houck was born in Mobile, Alabama, on July 26, 1926.  He was ordained a priest by Archbishop Thomas Toolen on May 19, 1951, for the Archdiocese of Mobile.

On March 28, 1979, Houck was named auxiliary bishop of the Diocese of Jackson and titular bishop of Alexanum by Pope John Paul II in St. Peter's Basilica in Rome.  Houck was consecrated by the pope on May 27, 1979.  Houck was appointed bishop of the Diocese of Jackson on April 11, 1984 by John Paul II and installed on June 5, 1984.

On January 3, 2003, John Paul II accepted Houck's resignation as bishop of Jackson.William Houck died on March 9, 2016, at St. Dominic's Hospital in Jackson of complications following heart surgery.

References

Episcopal succession

1926 births
2016 deaths
Roman Catholic bishops of Jackson
People from Mobile, Alabama
Roman Catholic Archdiocese of Mobile
Catholics from Alabama
20th-century American Roman Catholic titular bishops